Huxleyia habooba is a species of small, monomyarian, nuculoid bivalve.
It is suspected of benefiting from chemosymbiosis with sulphur-oxidizing bacteria.

References

Further reading
VOKES, HAROLD E. "A new species of the bivalve genus Nucinella from the Eocene of Louisiana." Tulane Studies of Geology and Paleontology 5 (1966): 38-40.
Allen, J. A. "Evolution of the deep sea protobranch bivalves." Philosophical Transactions of the Royal Society B: Biological Sciences 284.1001 (1978): 387-401.
Kase, Tomoki, and Itaru Hayami. "Unique submarine cave mollusc fauna: composition, origin and adaptation." Journal of Molluscan Studies 58.4 (1992): 446-449.
Adams, Arthur. "XXXIV.—On some new genera and species of Mollusca from Japan." Journal of Natural History 5.28 (1860): 299-303.

External links

WORMS entry

Nucinellidae
Molluscs described in 2011